Bukhuti (Buchuti) Ivanovich Gurgenidze (November 13, 1933 – May 24, 2008) was a Georgian chess Grandmaster, born in Surami.

He was a multiple Georgian Champion, and played in eight USSR Chess Championships. He shared first place with Mikhail Tal at Tbilisi in 1969–70 and placed first at Olomouc in 1976.  Gurgenidze was a trainer to several women grandmasters in the Soviet Union. He was a geologist by profession.

His name is attached to the Gurgenidze Variation in the Sicilian Defence (1.e4 c5 2.Nf3 Nc6 3. Bb5 g6 4.0-0 Bg7 5.Re1 e5 6.b4).
and in the Caro-Kann
Gurgenidze Variation: 1.e4 c6 2.d4 d5 3.Nc3 g6; it is because of this variation, originated by Bukhuti Gurgenidze, that 3.Nc3 fell from favour in the 1970s. 3.Nd2 has since been regarded as the accurate way to reach the positions arising from ... dxe4. After 3.Nd2, ... g6 is met by 4.c3, when the fianchettoed bishop has little to do. He also played the original 1.e4 c6 2.d4 d5 3.Nc3 b5!? at least once, in a game he lost against Mikhail Tal.

Gurgenidze was awarded the International Master (IM) title in 1966 and the Grandmaster (GM) title in 1970.

References

External links
 Bukhuti Gurgenidze rating card at FIDE 
 
 

1933 births
2008 deaths
Chess grandmasters
Chess theoreticians
Chess coaches
Chess players from Georgia (country)
Soviet chess players
20th-century chess players